Khlebny (masculine), Khlebnaya (feminine), or Khlebnoye (neuter) is the name of several rural localities in Russia:
Khlebny, Rostov Oblast, a settlement in Gigantovskoye Rural Settlement of Salsky District of Rostov Oblast
Khlebny, Saratov Oblast, a railway crossing loop in Krasnokutsky District of Saratov Oblast
Khlebny, Stavropol Krai, a settlement in Aygursky Selsoviet of Apanasenkovsky District of Stavropol Krai
Khlebnoye, a selo in Khlebenskoye Rural Settlement of Novousmansky District of Voronezh Oblast